Willie Joyce (September 2, 1917 – December 5, 1996) was an American boxer from Chicago. He was the 1936 National AAU Bantamweight champion, and the 1937 (126 lb) Chicago & Intercity Golden Gloves Champion.

Joyce was 24-1-4 in 1937 to 1939 only losing to Frankie Covelli. He fought Lew Jenkins at the White City Arena in Chicago three times in 1939, battling to a draw in their first bout and winning the next two by split decision.

He fought Henry Armstrong four times in 1943 and 1944. In the first match he beat Armstrong at the Olympic Auditoriumin Los Angeles. The second fight he lost to Armstrong at the Gilmore Stadium, also in Los Angeles. The third fight he beat Armstrong at Chicago Stadium. In their final meeting Armstrong was the victor beating Joyce at the Civic Auditorium in San Francisco.

Joyce also fought Willie Pep. Pep beat Joyce at Comiskey Park in Chicago in 1944. In 1944 and 1945, Joyce went 3-1 against Ike Williams and in 1945, split two bouts with Chalky Wright.

Joyce would go on to face Tippy Larkin in three fights, losing all three by decision. In their second fight, Larkin beat Joyce for the vacant World Jr. Welterweight Title at the Boston Garden. In their third fight, Joyce lost to Larkin for the World Jr. Welterweight Title at Madison Square Garden in New York.

Joyce also fought Johnny Bratton at the Chicago Stadium in 1946, losing in both fights.

Professional boxing record

References

External links

 http://www.boxrec.com/media/index.php?title=Human:9618

1917 births	
1996 deaths
Boxers from Chicago
American male boxers
Bantamweight boxers